L-asparaginase is an enzyme that in humans is encoded by the ASRGL1 gene.

Function 
The ASRGL1 protein consists of 308 amino acids and is activated by autocleavage at amino acid 168 to form an alpha- and a beta-chain, which can dimerize into a heterodimer. The ASRGL1 enzyme has both L-asparaginase and beta-aspartyl peptidase activity and may be involved in the production of L-aspartate, which can act as an excitatory neurotransmitter in some brain regions.

According to antibody-based profiling and transcriptomics analysis, ASRGL1 protein is present in all analysed human tissues, with highest expression in brain, in female tissues such as the uterine cervix and fallopian tube, and in male tissues as testis. Based on confocal microscopy ASRGL1 is mainly localized to the microtubules.

Clinical significance 
ASRGL1 is highly expressed in the normal endometrium and differentially expressed in endometrial cancer. Loss of ASRGL1 expression is an unfavorable prognostic feature for patients with endometrial cancer.

References

External links
 ASRGL1 expression in the Human Protein Atlas

Further reading